The United States Virgin Islands are a group of several dozen islands and cays located in the Caribbean, about  southeast of Florida,  north of Venezuela,  east of Puerto Rico, and immediately west and south of the British Virgin Islands.

Together with the British Virgin Islands, Vieques, and Culebra, they make up the Virgin Islands archipelago.

The hilly, volcanic islands of Saint Thomas and Saint John border the North Atlantic Ocean to the north and the Caribbean Sea to the south.

Charlotte Amalie, Saint Thomas is one of the best natural, deepwater harbors in the Caribbean. The Islands have many well-known beaches, including Magens Bay (Saint Thomas) and Trunk Bay (Saint John), and coral reefs, including the Virgin Islands Coral Reef National Monument and the Buck Island Reef National Monument. More than half of Saint John and nearly all of Hassel Island are owned by the U.S. National Park Service.

Statistics 
Geographic coordinates (capital Charlotte Amalie): 

Islands:
Saint Croix, Saint Thomas, Saint John, Water Island, many other islands

Area:
total: 738 sq mi (1,910 km²)
land: 134 sq mi (346 km²)
water: 604 sq mi (1,564 km²)

Comparative area: twice the size of the District of Columbia

Maritime claims:
exclusive economic zone: 
territorial sea: 

Land use:
arable land: 5.71%
permanent crops: 2.86%
other: 91.43% (2005)

Irrigated land:
1 km²

Natural hazards:frequent and severe droughts and floods; occasional earthquakes; rare tsunamis

Environment—current issues:
lack of natural freshwater resources

Terrain 
The islands' terrain is mostly hilly to rugged and mountainous with little level land. Crown Mountain, on Saint Thomas, is the highest point in the U.S. Virgin Islands at 1,555 ft (474 m). Sea level is the lowest point. The territory is known for its beaches and plentiful sunshine.

Climate 

The U.S. Virgin Islands enjoy a tropical climate, moderated by easterly trade winds and with relatively low humidity. Temperatures vary little throughout the year.

Rainfall can be quite variable, but the wettest months on average are September to November and the driest months on average are February and March.

The islands are subject to tropical storms and hurricanes, with the hurricane season running from June to November. In recent history, substantial damage was caused by Hurricane Irma and Hurricane Maria in 2017, Hurricane Hugo in 1989 and Hurricane Marilyn in 1995.  The islands were also struck by Hurricane Bertha in 1996, Hurricane Georges in 1998, Hurricane Lenny in 1999, Tropical Storm Jeanne in 2004, Hurricane Omar in 2008, Hurricane Earl in 2010, Tropical Storm Otto in 2010, and Tropical Storm Tomas in 2010, but damage was less severe in those storms.

See also
 Islands of the United States Virgin Islands

References